Romance for Bugle is a 1967 Czechoslovakian drama film directed by Otakar Vávra. It was entered into the 5th Moscow International Film Festival where it won the Special Silver Prize. It is based on the lyrical epic poem of the same name written in 1961 by František Hrubín.

Cast
 Zuzana Cigánová
 Věra Crháková
 Jaromír Hanzlík
 Miriam Kantorková
 Stefan Kvietik
 Karel Roden as Funeral Agent
 Jaroslav Rozsíval
 Marie Stampachová
 Jiří Štancl
 Janusz Strachocki
 Václav Švec
 Július Vašek

References

External links
 

1967 films
1967 romantic drama films
1960s Czech-language films
Czechoslovak black-and-white films
Films directed by Otakar Vávra
Czech romantic drama films
1960s Czech films